The Ostrovo Unit was a Field hospital unit with Transport Coloumn of the Scottish Women's Hospitals. It comprised approximately 200 tents and was situated near Lake Ostrovo, Macedonia during the First World War under the command of the Serbian Army.
It was often called The America Unit as the money to fund it came from America and except for a few dressing stations, it was the Allied hospital nearest the front.

Beginnings
The unit opened in September 1916 soon after the Battle of Malka Nidzhe (Gornichevo ridge). Gornichevo ridge formed the twin summits of Kaimaktsalan, 7,700 and 8,200 feet above sea level. This ridge had to be captured before Monastir (Bitola on modern British maps) could be re-taken. The first Chief Medical Officer, an Australian, Dr Agnes Elizabeth Lloyd Bennett recorded on the first day that they took 24 cases: "all terribly bad wounds - abdominal, chest, head and compound fractures." On 25 September she wrote: "We now have 160 cases, all bad and it is terribly hard work." During the first eight weeks the America Unit admitted 425 cases of whom sixty died.

Location
The unit was approximately ninety miles west of Salonika and was in a beautiful location. According to its third CMO Dr Isobel Emslie: "It lay quite by itself on a green sward in the hollow of the hills which rose on every side; close by was a clump of ancient elm-trees, the home of families of cawing rooks, and beyond the white tents of the hospital lay Lake Ostrovo."

Miles Franklin wrote: "The royal sunlight on the purple hills! Blue as heaven, high and peaked like cats' teeth, they intensified a longing for the Blue Bogongs that was ten years poignant." Franklin was inspired to write a story, By Far Kaimaktchalan and a piece entitled Somewhere in the Balkans but finished neither. Ne Mari Nishta (It matters nothing) remains her only finished account of her time there. She left in February 1918.

Staff
The America Unit was the unit of the Scottish Women's Hospitals in which at least ten Australian women served including Agnes Bennett, Mary De Garis and the novelist Miles Franklin. Other Australians served in a similar unit near Salonika. The Anglo-Irish medical physicist Edith Anne Stoney provided x-ray support to the unit while being based at Salonika. British masseuse and trained physical instructor, Olive Smith joined the unit with Dr Bennett at the start, and worked in the operating theatre and reception, but died of malaria on 6 October 1916.

The Spirit of the Camp
In Dr Isobel Emslie's words: "The spirit of this unit was a very pleasant one; the big, happy family of women was so entirely thrown on its own resources that it formed a very united body. Most of the sisters had been so much with the Serbians that they had learnt the language and were thoroughly in sympathy with them. Ours was a Serbian Army hospital, and we took our orders directly from Army Headquarters."
At the advanced dressing station established three hours drive further up Kaimaktsalan the unit took casualties direct from the battlefield. Dr Bennett wrote of the girls' courage during bombardment. However malaria and dysentery took such a toll on the staff that the station was closed in September 1917.

Closure of the Unit
On 30 September 1918 the unit received news of the armistice with Bulgaria and on the morning of 23 October the unit started for northern Serbia with a convoy of nine vehicles on a 311 kilometre trek. All the staff made the trip and the unit set up in an abandoned army barracks in Vranje. The unit was in operation until October 1919. Fifty two of the members of the Vranje Unit were decorated with the Royal Red Cross and several also received the Order of Saint Sava.

See also 
 Mary De Garis
 Isabel Emslie Hutton

References

 Hutton, I Emslie (1928) With a woman's unit in Serbia, Salonika and Sebastopol Williams and Norgate, London
 McLaren, Eva Shaw (1919) A History of the Scottish Women's Hospitals Hodder and Stoughton, London
 Gilchrist, Hugh (1997). Australians and Greeks, Volume 2. Halstead Press, Sydney
 Manson, Cecil and Celia (1960) Doctor Agnes Bennett Michael Joseph, London
 Leneman, Leah (1994) In the Service of Life: Story of Elsie Inglis and the Scottish Women's Hospitals Mercat Press
 Corbett, Elsie (1964) Red Cross in Serbia, 1915-1919: a personal diary of experiences Cheney & Sons
 Ross, Ishobel (1988) Little Grey Partridge: First World War Diary of Ishobel Ross Who Served With the Scottish Women's Hospitals Unit in Serbia Aberdeen University Press

Military hospitals in Serbia
Bulgaria in World War I
Campaigns and theatres of World War I
Greece in World War I
Modern history of Greek Macedonia
Serbia in World War I
Vardar Macedonia (1912–1918)
Wars involving the Balkans
Scottish Women's Hospitals for Foreign Service